Inderjit singh, popularly known as Nikku, is an Indian singer and actor associated with Punjabi language music and films.

Discography

Filmography

References
 

Living people
Indian male film actors
Musicians from Ludhiana
Male actors in Punjabi cinema
21st-century Indian male actors
Male actors from Ludhiana
21st-century Indian singers
Singers from Punjab, India
21st-century Indian male singers
Year of birth missing (living people)